John Augustine Tyree Jr (3 Oct 1911 – 8 Apr 2004), was a decorated submarine commander during World War II who reached the rank of Vice Admiral in the United States Navy.

He was born in born in Blackstone, Virginia.

He commanded Finback on its fourth through eighth war patrols and was awarded two Navy Crosses for his actions in command which he relinquished on 16 May 1944. He was then appointed as naval aide to President Franklin D. Roosevelt and continued to serve as aide to President Harry S. Truman attending the Yalta Conference with him.

Rear Admiral Tyree was placed in command of the combined Latin America-U.S. Task Force 137, the Naval quarantine of Cuba during the Cuban Missile Crisis.

References

United States Naval Academy alumni
1911 births
2004 deaths
United States Navy personnel of World War II
Recipients of the Navy Cross (United States)
United States Navy vice admirals